The 2019 FIBA Basketball World Cup Final was the concluding basketball game which determined the winner of the 2019 FIBA Basketball World Cup. The game was played on 15 September 2019, at the Wukesong Arena, in Beijing, China, between Argentina and Spain.

At halftime, a turnover ceremony was held to officially hand over the hosting rights of the FIBA Basketball World Cup from China to the Philippines, Japan, and Indonesia, hosts of the 2023 FIBA Basketball World Cup, which will take place from 25 August to 10 September.

Spain won their second World Cup title after a 95–75 win. Marc Gasol became the first player since Lamar Odom in 2010 to win an NBA championship and a World Cup in the same year, and the first non-American to win an NBA or WNBA title and either a World Cup or Olympic gold medal in the same year.

Route to the final

Argentina 
Argentina topped Group B in Wuhan, after beating Russia in the final group game. They also defeated South Korea and Nigeria to end with a 3–0 record in the first round. Group I in Foshan also saw the South Americans topping the group, thereby qualifying to the quarter-finals. Their win against Poland won them the group. In the quarter-finals at Dongguan, Argentina defeated 2014 World Cup runners-up and 2016 Olympic silver medalists Serbia by 10 points to qualify to the semi-finals. France, which had defeated the United States in their own quarter-final match-up, faced the South Americans in the semi-final at Beijing. Luis Scola scored his tournament-high 28 points in the game, and Rudy Gobert was limited to just three points, which led to Argentina advancing to its first World Cup final since 2002, which was Scola's first.

Spain 
The Spaniards finished on top of Group C in Guangzhou. The Europeans defeated Tunisia, Puerto Rico and Iran to end up undefeated going into the second round. At the second round Group J at Wuhan, Spain ran away winners of the group after defeating Italy and erstwhile undefeated team Serbia to finish the group stages with a 5–0 record. In the quarter-finals at Shanghai, Spain eliminated surprise qualifiers Poland, off the back of Ricky Rubio's near double-double of 19 points and nine assists, plus five rebounds. A pair of three-point shots was the difference late in the fourth quarter that prevented the Poles from cutting the lead. In the semi-final against Australia at Beijing, the Australians led by as many as 11 points in the third quarter, but the Spaniards came back to tie the game at the end of regulation, 71-all. In overtime, Marc Gasol and Patty Mills scored three-pointers, but with the game tied at 78-all, Mills was fouled, and converted both free-throws. Gasol was fouled himself on the next possession, and also made both of his foul shots. Matthew Dellavedova tried to win it at the buzzer, but missed, sending the game to double overtime. Spain opened the second overtime with two three-pointers, and that was the difference, qualifying them to their second World Cup final, after winning it in 2006.

Game details

This is the eighth meeting between Argentina and Spain at the World Cup, with the Spaniards winning five; Argentina won two, including their last meeting at the 2010 World Championship. Spain won the last competitive meeting, at the 2016 Summer Olympics.

Spain led by 14–2 at the start of the game. Argentina recovered to finish the first quarter with 14 points against Spain's 22. The lead then fluctuated, but once the Argentinians cut the deficit to twelve at the start of the third quarter, the Spaniards went on a 14–0 run, leading by 55–33. The Spaniards never looked back. Ricky Rubio scored 20 points in the game, and limited Facundo Campazzo to just 11 points in 20% field-goal percentage. Luis Scola was also limited to 1/10 shooting in the game, and didn't score until making his free-throws late in the third quarter, as Gabriel Deck had a game high 24 points. Marc Gasol scored 14 points, had a team high 7 assists, had 2 steals, and blocked 3 shots in the game. Argentina tried to mount a comeback in the fourth period, but by then the lead was too great, and there was little time remaining by then. Spain won its second World Cup, with Gasol and Fernández being also a part of the first title in 2006.

Rosters

References

External links
Official website

Final
FIBA Basketball World Cup Finals
Sports competitions in Beijing
World
FIBA Basketball World Cup Final
September 2019 sports events in China
Spain national basketball team games